Munyange is a sub-location in the Mahiga location of Kenya's Nyeri County, in the former Central Province.

References 

1. Munyange 

Populated places in Central Province (Kenya)